Flintoff is a surname. Notable people with the surname include:

Andrew Flintoff (born 1977), English cricketer 
Corey Flintoff (born 1946), American newscaster
Debbie Flintoff-King (born 1960), Australian hurdler
Tess Flintoff (born 2003), Australian cricketer

See also
Flintoft